Namba Station (難波駅) may refer to:
JR Namba Station, a railway station in Namba, Naniwa Ward, Osaka, Japan
Namba Station (Nankai), a pair of railway stations in the Namba district of Chūō-ku, Osaka, Japan: one owned by Nankai Electric Railway, and one owned by Osaka Metro
Ōsaka Namba Station, a railway station on the Kintetsu Namba Line and Hanshin Namba Line in the Namba district of Chūō-ku, Osaka, Japan